Groote is a Dutch surname. Notable people with the surname include:

Geert Groote (1340–1384), Dutch Roman Catholic deacon and theologian
Jan Friso Groote (born 1965), Dutch computer scientist
Matthias Groote (born 1973), German politician

See also
De Groote
De Groot

Dutch-language surnames